Soutsakhone Somninhom (born 22 May 1958) is a Laotian former sprinter. He competed in the men's 100 metres at the 1980 Summer Olympics. Somninhom competed in heat 2 and finished 7th out of seven runners with a time of 11.69 seconds. He finished with the second-slowest time, he beat Peru's José Luis Elias (13.66 seconds) and finished just behind Nepal's Raghu Raj Onta (11.61 seconds).

References

External links
 

1958 births
Living people
Athletes (track and field) at the 1980 Summer Olympics
Laotian male sprinters
Olympic athletes of Laos
Place of birth missing (living people)